The World Rugby Men's Sevens Series is an annual series of international rugby sevens tournaments run by World Rugby featuring national sevens teams. Organised for the first time in the 1999–2000 season as the IRB World Sevens Series, the competition was formed to promote an elite-level of international rugby sevens and develop the game into a viable commercial product. The competition has been sponsored by banking group HSBC since 2014.

The season's circuit consists of 10 tournaments that generally begin in November or December and last until May. The venues are held across 10 countries, and visits five of the six populated continents. The United Arab Emirates, South Africa, Australia, New Zealand, the United States, Canada, Hong Kong, Singapore, France and England each host one event. Each tournament has 16 teams – 15 core teams that participate in each tournament and one regional qualifier.

Teams compete for the World Rugby Series title by accumulating points based on their finishing position in each tournament. The lowest placed core team at the end of the season is dropped, and replaced by the winner of the Hong Kong Sevens. New Zealand had originally dominated the Series, winning each of the first six seasons from 1999–2000 to 2004–05, but since then, Fiji, South Africa, Samoa and Australia have each won season titles. England and the United States have placed in the top three for several seasons but have not won the series title.

The International Olympic Committee's decision in 2009 to add rugby sevens to the Summer Olympics beginning in 2016 has added a boost to rugby sevens and to the World Sevens Series; this boost has led to increased exposure and revenues, leading several of the core teams to field fully professional squads.

History

International sevens
The first international rugby sevens tournament was held in 1973 in Scotland, which was celebrating a century of the Scottish Rugby Union. Seven international teams took part, with England defeating Ireland 22–18 in the final to take the trophy. The Hong Kong Sevens annual tournament began in 1976. Over the next two decades the number of international sevens competitions increased. The most notable was the Rugby World Cup Sevens with Scotland hosting the inaugural event in 1993, along with rugby joining the Commonwealth Games program in 1998.

World Series early years

The first season of the World Sevens Series was the 1999–2000 season. At the Series launch, the chairman of the International Rugby Board, Vernon Pugh, described the IRB's vision of the role of this new competition: "this competition has set in place another important element in the IRB’s drive to establish rugby as a truly global sport, one with widespread visibility and steadily improving standards of athletic excellence." New Zealand and Fiji dominated the first series, meeting in the final in eight of the ten season tournaments, and New Zealand narrowly won, overtaking Fiji by winning the last tournament of the series.

New Zealand won the first six seasons in a row from 1999–2000 to 2004–05, led by players such as Karl Te Nana and Amasio Valence. The number of stops in the series varied over the seasons, but experienced a contraction from 11 tournaments in 2001–02 to 7 tournaments in 2002–03 due to the global recession. In the 2005–06 season Fiji clinched the season trophy on the last tournament of the season finishing ahead of England. New Zealand regained the trophy in 2006–07 season in the last tournament of the season.

South Africa was the next team to win the series after taking home the 2008–09 title. In the 2009–10 season, Samoa who finished seventh the previous year shocked the world – led by 2010 top try-scorer and World Rugby Sevens Player of the Year Mikaele Pesamino – by winning four of the last five tournaments to overtake New Zealand and win the series.

Olympic era and professionalism
The 2011–12 season was the last to have 12 core teams as the 2011–12 series expanded to 15 teams that had core status. Qualification for these places was played out at the 2012 Hong Kong Sevens. Canada (returning to core status for the first time since 2008), Spain and Portugal joined the 12 core teams for the next season. The Japan event also made a return for the first time since 2001 (lasting until 2015). New Zealand continued their dominance by finishing on top.

Argentina was originally planned to begin hosting a tenth event with Mar Del Plata the venue in the 2012–13 season, giving the tour an event on each continent, but when Argentina joined the Rugby Championship those plans were shelved. With the same schedule, New Zealand again were the winners over South Africa. They took it again in 2013–14 with Spain the first team to be relegated after finishing last during that season with Japan replacing them.

Heading into the 2014–15 season, the top four teams qualifying to the 2016 Summer Olympics, with Fiji, South Africa, New Zealand and Great Britain all qualifying through. The 2014–15 season and 2015–16 season were won by Fiji – the first time a team other than New Zealand won back-to-back season titles – led by 2015 and 2016 season Dream Team nominee Osea Kolinisau The two seasons also yielded teams winning their first tournaments – the United States won the 2015 London Sevens to finish the season in sixth overall; Kenya won the 2016 Singapore Sevens, and Scotland won the 2016 London Sevens. Prior to the 2015–16 season World Rugby did a comprehensive review of all nine tournament hosts and adjusted the schedule, dropping two sites (Japan and Scotland), and adding three sites (France, Singapore and Canada) to the calendar.

In the 2016–17 series, a dominant and consistent display by South Africa saw them reach the finals of the 2016–17 series rounds on eight occasions, winning five of these. As a result, South Africa were series champions with victory in the penultimate round in Paris. The season was a qualifier for the 2018 Rugby World Cup Sevens with the top four teams that had not already qualified, coming from this season. The teams that made it through to the World Cup via this method were Canada, Argentina, Scotland and Samoa.

Tournament hosts 

The World Series has consisted of 10 scheduled tournament stops since the 2015–16 season, which generally fall in the same order and timeframes. From 2020 to 2022, however, several of these events had to be cancelled due to impacts of the COVID-19 pandemic.

Key:
 Event added for the 2022–23 season

Notes

Teams, promotion and relegation

Core teams
A group of core teams, currently 15 in number, is announced for each season based on performances in the previous season. Each core team has a guaranteed place in all of that season's events. The core teams have been selected through a designated promotion/relegation process since the 2012–13 season.

Key: * indicates a tied placing

Notes

Invited teams 
Non-core teams are also invited to compete in every season of the World Rugby Sevens Series. With 15 core teams, there is generally now only one invited team at each 16-team tournament. Before 2012–13, when there were only 12 core teams, four places at each tournament were usually available to invited teams. 

Key: * indicates a tied placing

Promotion and relegation

In 2019, World Rugby announced a plan to create a second-tier competition that would allow the best thirteen sevens teams, with the addition of three invited teams, from their region to compete in a similar style format to the Sevens Series for the potential of gaining promotion to the World Rugby Sevens Series and becoming a core team. This breaks from the usual format of promotion and relegation in the sevens series.

From 2013–14 series to 2018–19 the promotion/relegation was as follows:
 One team is relegated and one team is promoted each year.
 The core team that finishes bottom of the table at the end of the season series is relegated.
 The team that wins the 12-team qualifying tournament at the Hong Kong Sevens is promoted.

From 2020 onwards the style of promotion/relegation will be as such:

 One team is relegated and one team is promoted each year.
 The core team that finishes bottom of the table at the end of the season series is relegated to the Challenger Series.
 Eight teams will compete for promotion in the Hong Kong Sevens event after qualifying through the Challenger Series.

Notes

Other qualifying
The World Series results are sometimes used as a qualifier for other tournaments. For example, the top four teams of the 2014–15 series automatically qualified for the 2016 Summer Olympics. Similarly, certain teams from the 2016–17 series qualified for the 2018 Rugby World Cup Sevens.

Historical results

Top-6 placings by season
Summary of the top six placegetters for each series:

Notes

Top-6 placings by team 
Tally of top six placings in the series for each team, updated after the most recently completed 2021–22 season (obtained by summing the placings of each team as recorded in the above table of results by season).

Events won 

List of legs won by each team since 1999. 

Updated on 2 March 2023.

Format 
Rugby sevens is a fast-paced version of rugby union with seven players each side on a full-sized rugby field. Games are much shorter, lasting seven minutes each half. The game is quicker and faster-scoring than 15-a-side rugby, which explains part of its appeal. It also gives players the space for superb feats of individual skill. Sevens is traditionally played in a two-day tournament format. Currently, in a normal event, 16 teams are entered.

World Rugby operates satellite tournaments in each continent alongside the Sevens World Series which serve as qualifiers for Series events; in 2012–13 they also determined the entrants in the World Series Pre-Qualifier, and since 2013–14 determine the entrants in the Core Team Qualifier.

In each tournament, the teams are divided into pools of four teams, who play a round-robin within the pool. Points are awarded in each pool on a different schedule from most rugby tournaments—3 for a win, 2 for a draw, 1 for a loss, 0 for a no-show. In case teams are tied after pool play, the tiebreakers are:

Head-to-head result between the tied teams.
Difference in points scored and allowed during pool play.
Difference in tries scored and allowed during pool play.
Points scored during pool play.
Coin toss.

As of the 2009–10 series, four trophies are awarded in each tournament. In descending order of prestige, they are the Cup, whose winner is the overall tournament champion, Plate, Bowl and Shield. Each trophy is awarded at the end of a knockout tournament.

In a normal event, the top two teams in each pool advance to the Cup competition. The four quarterfinal losers drop into the bracket for the Plate. The Bowl is contested by the third and fourth-place finishers in each pool, while the Shield is contested by the losing quarterfinalists of the Bowl.

A third-place match is now conducted between the losing Cup semifinalists in all tournaments; this was introduced for the 2011–12 series.

In 2012–13, the season-ending London Sevens expanded to 20 teams, with 12 competing for series points and eight involved in the Core Team Qualifier. With the promotion place now determined at the Hong Kong Sevens, the London Sevens returned to the traditional 16-team format in 2013–14.

Hong Kong 7s
The Hong Kong Sevens (an anomaly as a three-day event) is the most famous sevens tournament.
The Hong Kong Sevens had 24 teams through the 2011–12 series, but has featured 28 teams since 2012–13, with 15 core teams and the winner of the HSBC Asian Sevens Series competing for series points. At the 2013 event, the remaining 12 teams were those in the World Series Pre-Qualifier; from 2014 forward, the remaining 12 teams are those in the Core Team Qualifier.
In Hong Kong, the Shield was awarded for the first time in 2010.

Originally, the six pool winners of the Hong Kong Sevens, plus the two highest-finishing second-place teams, advanced to the Cup.

In 2010 and 2011, a different system was used:
 The losing quarterfinalists in the Cup competition contested the Plate competition.
 The four remaining second-place teams and the four best third-place teams, which contested the Plate in previous years, competed for the Bowl.
 The remaining eight teams in the competition, which contested the Bowl in previous years, competed for the Shield.

In the transitional year of 2012, the Hong Kong Sevens was split into two separate competitions. The 12 core teams competed for the Cup, Plate and Bowl under a format similar to that of a regular event. The 12 invited teams all competed for the Shield, with the top three sides in that competition also earning core status for 2012–13.

From 2013 on, the Hong Kong Sevens was played under the same 16-team format used in the rest of the series, with typically 15 core teams plus an invited team (for Hong Kong, usually the winner of the HSBC Asian Sevens Series) competing in the main draw of the tournament. In line with changes which began at the start of the 2016–17 World Rugby Sevens Series, the duration of the Cup final was reduced from 20 minutes to 14 minutes in 2017. In that season, the number of trophies was also reduced to two; the main Cup contested by the top eight teams from the pool stage, and a Challenge Trophy contested by the bottom eight teams from the pool stage.

Points schedule 
The season championship is determined by points earned in each tournament. World Rugby introduced a new scoring system for the 2011–12 series, in which all teams participating in a tournament are guaranteed points. Initially, World Rugby announced the new points schedule only for the standard 16-team events; the allocations for the Hong Kong Sevens were announced later. A new scoring system was introduced in 2019–20 requiring teams to play for 7th, 11th and 15th places, previously teams had tied for 7th–8th 11th–12th and 15th–16th places.

The current points schedule used at each standard event is summarised below.

{|class = "wikitable" style="text-align:center;"
|-
! Place
! Status
! Points
|-
| 
| Cup winner, gold medalist 
| 22
|-
| 
| Cup runner-up, silver medalist
| 19
|-
| 
| 3rd-place winner, bronze medalist
| 17
|-
| 4
| 3rd-place loser
| 15
|-
!colspan=3|
|-
| 5
| 5th-place winner
| 13
|-
| 6
| 5th-place loser
| 12
|-
| 7
| 7th-place winner
| 11
|-
| 8
| 7th-place loser
| 10
|-
!colspan=3|
|-
| 9
| 9th-place winner
| 8
|-
| 10
| 9th-place loser
| 7
|-
| 11
| 11th-place winner
| 6
|-
| 12
| 11th-place loser
| 5
|-
!colspan=3|
|-
| 13
| 13th-place winner
| 4
|-
| 14
| 13th-place loser
| 3
|-
| 15
| 15th-place winner
| 2
|-
| 16
| 15th-place loser
| 1
|}

Tie-breaking: If two or more teams are level on overall series points, the following tie-breakers are used:
Overall difference in points scored and allowed during the season.
Total try count during the season.
If neither of the above produces a winner, the teams are considered tied.

Business

TV and media

The tour received 1,147 hours of air time in 2005–06; 530 of which was live, and was broadcast to 136 countries. By 2008–09, the hours of air time had increased to over 3,300, with 35 broadcasters airing the series in 139 countries and 15 languages. Broadcast time increased further in 2009–10, with 3,561 hours of air time (1,143 hours live) carried by 34 broadcasters in 141 countries and 16 languages. In 2010–11, 3,657 hours of coverage were aired (1,161 hours live), with the same number of broadcasters as the previous season but six new countries added. For that season, Sevens World Series programming was available in 332 million homes worldwide, with a potential audience of 760 million.

Sponsorship
The International Rugby Board reached a 5-year deal with HSBC in October 2010 that granted them status as the first-ever title sponsor of the Sevens World Series. Through the agreement, HSBC acquired title naming rights to all tournaments in the World Series, beginning with the Dubai Sevens on 3 December 2010. HSBC has since sub-licensed the naming rights to individual tournaments, while retaining its name sponsorship of the overall series. A renewed, 4-year deal was announced before the 2015–16 Series, this deal was also expanded to include the World Rugby Women's Sevens Series.

Player contracts and salaries
In the year after the International Olympic Committee announced in 2009 that rugby sevens would return to the Olympics in 2016, most of the "core teams" on the Series began offering full-time contracts to their players. These annual salaries can range from €18,000 to €100,000. England offers among the more generous salaries, ranging from an estimated €25,000 to over €100,000. New Zealand has a graded system with salaries ranging from €23,000-plus to about €52,500 for its four top earners. The basic salary for Scottish sevens players ranges from €22,500 to €40,000. The Australian sevens players are estimated to be on a basic salary of about €27,000-plus. Toward the bottom end of the scale is Ireland, offering its players a €18,000 to €23,750 development contract, less than minimum wage.

Player awards by season

Player records
Players in bold are still active.

Tries

Updated 5 March 2023

Points

Updated: 2 February 2023

Matches

Source: World Rugby, 23 January 2023.

See also

 Rugby sevens at the Summer Olympics
 Rugby World Cup Sevens
 World Rugby Women's Sevens Series

References

External links
 Official site

 
Sevens
Rugby sevens competitions
Sports competition series
Recurring sporting events established in 1999